The Bartlesville Barflies was a Barbershop quartet from Bartlesville, Oklahoma that won the 1939 SPEBSQSA original international competition. The victorious line-up was the following:

Tenor: George McCaslin
Lead: Harry Hall
Bass: Herman Kaiser
Baritone: Bob Durand

References 

Barbershop quartets
Barbershop Harmony Society